Arethaea gracilipes, the thin-footed thread-leg katydid, is a species of phaneropterine katydid in the family Tettigoniidae. It is found in North America.

Subspecies
These three subspecies belong to the species Arethaea gracilipes:
 Arethaea gracilipes cerciata Hebard, 1936 i c g
 Arethaea gracilipes gracilipes (Thomas, 1870) i c g
 Arethaea gracilipes papago Hebard, 1935 i c g
Data sources: i = ITIS, c = Catalogue of Life, g = GBIF, b = Bugguide.net

References

Phaneropterinae
Articles created by Qbugbot
Insects described in 1870